Confess, Fletch is a 2022 American crime comedy film directed by Greg Mottola, who also co-wrote the screenplay with Zev Borow. Based on Gregory Mcdonald's 1976 novel of the same name, the film stars Jon Hamm, Lorenza Izzo, Marcia Gay Harden, Kyle MacLachlan, Roy Wood Jr., and John Slattery. It is the third installment in the Fletch series, following Fletch (1985) and Fletch Lives (1989), and the first not to star Chevy Chase.

Confess, Fletch was released in a limited theatrical release and on premium video on demand on September 16, 2022, before a Showtime premiere on October 28, 2022. The film received generally positive reviews.

Plot
Irwin Maurice "Fletch" Fletcher is sent to Boston from Italy by his girlfriend Angela to recover her father’s multimillion-dollar art collection. The paintings were stolen and are in the possession of an American art dealer named Ronald Horan. Angela’s father is an Italian billionaire count who was kidnapped by a mob demanding his paintings as ransom. 

As Fletch arrives in a rented town house in Boston, he finds a dead woman, subsequently identified as barista Laurel Goodwin. Despite being the one who called the police, Fletch becomes the prime suspect in Goodwin's murder. Sergeant Inspector Monroe and Junior Detective Griz of the Boston Police Department begin tailing Fletch. 

Fletch meets with Horan under a fake name in an attempt to locate the paintings. Fletch learns from his neighbor Eve that Owen, the town house owner, has a history of violence and drug abuse and an ex-wife named Tatiana, who used to be his business partner. Fletch meets with Tatiana, again using a fake name, and suspects that she is the killer. Meanwhile, the Countess, Angela’s stepmother, invites herself to stay with Fletch. Angela is not happy with this development; she suspects that the Countess and her brother kidnapped the Count. Angela arrives in Boston and initially appears to be friendly with the Countess.

At dinner that night, Fletch, the Countess, and Angela are visited by Owen, Tatiana, and Eve. Laura Goodwin’s boyfriend arrives and tries to kill Fletch. When the boyfriend is distracted by Eve's dog, Fletch snatches his gun and learns that Angela knows and was in contact with Owen. Angela abruptly leaves in the middle of the evening.

Fletch follows Angela to a meeting with Horan on his sailboat. Fletch assumes that Angela stole the paintings and transferred them to Horan to sell. Horan reveals that he killed Laurel Goodwin and framed Fletch to eliminate him from the painting transaction. Horan planned to deceive Angela and pay off his debts by selling the Count's art collection. Horan pulls a gun and tries to kill Fletch, but is shot dead by Griz. 

The Count, who faked his kidnapping with Fletch's help as a test of his wife and daughter, returns and persuades Fletch to keep the paintings. Fletch, from an undisclosed location in Latin America, sends paintings to Eve, his previous boss, and two street artists, and a large check to the boyfriend of Laurel Goodwin.

Cast 
 Jon Hamm as Irwin Maurice "Fletch" Fletcher
 Roy Wood Jr. as Sergeant Inspector Monroe
 Ayden Mayeri as Junior Detective Griz
 Lorenza Izzo as Angela de Grassi a.k.a. "Andy"
 Kyle MacLachlan as Ronald Horan, a Boston art dealer
 Annie Mumolo as Eve, Owen's neighbor
 John Behlmann as Owen
 John Slattery as Frank Jaffe, Fletch's old boss who runs the Boston Sentinel now
 Lucy Punch as Tatiana, Owen's ex-wife
 Marcia Gay Harden as "Contessa"
 Erica McDermott as Detective #3
 Eugene Mirman as Yacht Club Security
 Kenneth Kimmins as The Commodore
 Robert Picardo as Count de Grassi

Production 
Following the release of Fletch (1985) and Fletch Lives (1989) starring Chevy Chase, attempts to reboot the series based on the Gregory Mcdonald novels frequently became mired in development hell. Names such as Kevin Smith and Jason Lee, Bill Lawrence and Zach Braff, and Jason Sudeikis were previously attached to the property.

In July 2020, it was reported that Jon Hamm would star in and produce an adaptation of the Mcdonald novel Confess, Fletch directed by Greg Mottola. In June 2021, Marcia Gay Harden, Kyle MacLachlan, Roy Wood Jr., and John Slattery joined the cast. Filming began in Boston on June 28, 2021. In July 2021, Ayden Mayeri, Lorenza Izzo, and Annie Mumolo joined the cast. As of July 7, 2021, the film was spotted shooting scenes in Worcester. The film had only a 27-day shooting schedule and Hamm and Mottola returned a portion of their salaries in order to secure an additional 3 days of filming.

Reception

Sequel
Shortly after the film's release, Mottola said he'd been hired to write a sequel based on the 1978 novel Fletch's Fortune, but said he was "not sure" if it would ever get made.

References

External links 
  at Miramax
 

2022 comedy films
2022 crime films
2020s American films
2020s comedy mystery films
2020s crime comedy films
2020s English-language films
American comedy mystery films
American crime comedy films
Films based on American novels
Films based on mystery novels
Films directed by Greg Mottola
Films scored by David Arnold
Films shot in Boston
Miramax films
Paramount Pictures films